Peter Ukeme Olawale (born 26 July 2002) is a Nigerian footballer who plays as a forward for Armenian club Noah on loan from the Hungarian club Debrecen.

Career statistics

Club

Notes

References

2002 births
Living people
Nigerian footballers
Nigeria youth international footballers
Association football forwards
Hapoel Ra'anana A.F.C. players
Debreceni VSC players
FC Noah players
Liga Leumit players
Nemzeti Bajnokság I players
Nigerian expatriate footballers
Expatriate footballers in Israel
Nigerian expatriate sportspeople in Israel
Expatriate footballers in Hungary
Nigerian expatriate sportspeople in Hungary
Expatriate footballers in Armenia
Nigerian expatriate sportspeople in Armenia